Carpobrotus chilensis is a species of succulent plant known by the common name sea fig. It grows on coastal sand dunes and bluffs and is used as an ornamental plant, and it is also edible. However, along with its even more troublesome cousin, C. edulis, it has invaded sections of the California coast at the expense of native vegetation, and is subject to control efforts.

Description 

It is similar to, and often mistaken for, its close relative the "ice plant" (Carpobrotus edulis), which is larger, and grows alongside and sometimes hybridizes with C. chilensis. For comparison, the larger flowers of C. edulis ( in diameter) are yellow or light pink, whereas C. chilensis flowers are smaller ( in diameter) and deep magenta.

The flowers open in the morning and close at night, and its can bloom and fruit all year round. The fruit has 8–10 chambres.

The plant can easily be propagated by cuttings, which can be planted immediately in the soil or instantly in the garden and will root without the need of rooting hormone or mist.

Taxonomy 
Along with C. edulis, it was once placed in Mesembryanthemum.

Distribution and habitat 
Usually found in warm temperate and subtropical areas, it is probably native to southern Africa. It is familiar elsewhere, particularly the coastline of western North America, where it is an introduced invasive species that has taken hold and become commonplace. It is also found, and naturalised, in Argentina, Chile, Peru, Ecuador, Australia, Spain, Greece, Southern England and New Zealand. Grown in sunny conditions, it is normally found within coastal dunes and bluffs, margins of estuaries, along roadsides; at elevations from sea level to  along the southern Pacific Coast of North America.

Ecology 
Growing well in poor sandy soil, this species is hardy and can withstand disturbance by humans, which is common on the well-travelled beaches where it grows. This trait gives it an advantage over many native plant species, causing it to become a threat to native coastal ecosystems where it has invaded.

Uses
The plant has a pleasant flavour, although it can be laxative if eaten in high quantity, especially its fruit. The plant can be consumed raw or cooked (especially its leaves), or dried for future use or made into pickles and chutney. There is only a tiny amount of flesh in the fruit, and it must be fully ripe otherwise it is very sour. The leaves can be used in salads and can also be used as a replacement for pickled cucumber.

Medicinal
The leaf juice is acerbic and slightly antiseptic. It can be mixed with water and used to treat diarrhoea, dysentery and stomach cramps, and can also be gargled to alleviate laryngitis, sore throat and mouth infections. Masticating its leaf tip and ingesting the juice may relieve a sore throat. The leaf juice is also used externally as a calming curative for burns, bruises, scrapes, cuts, grazes and sunburn, ringworm, eczema, dermatitis, sunburn, herpes, nappy rash, cold sores, cracked lips, chafing, skin conditions and allergies and curative for insect stings.

References

External links

Jepson Manual Treatment — Carpobrotus chilensis
USDA Plants Profile: Carpobrotus chilensis
Carpobrotus chilensis — U.C. Photo gallery

chilensis
Flora of Southern Africa
Plants described in 1810
Taxa named by N. E. Brown
Taxa named by Juan Ignacio Molina